"In My Room" is a 1963 song by the Beach Boys. 

In My Room may also refer to:

Albums
 In My Room (album), by Jacob Collier, 2016
 In My Room, by Judith Lefeber, 2004
 (Alone) In My Room, by Verdelle Smith, 1966; or the title song, covered by several performers
 U mojoj sobi, by Aleksandra Kovač, 2009

Songs
 "In My Room" (Frank Ocean song), 2019
 "In My Room", by Albert Hammond, Jr. from ¿Cómo Te Llama?
 "In My Room", by Deep Wound from Demo
 "In My Room", by Dinosaur Pile-Up from Nature Nurture
 "In My Room", by Energy Orchard from Shinola
 "In My Room", by Hawkwind from The Machine Stops
 "In My Room", by Hikaru Utada from First Love
 "In My Room", by In Flames from Battles
 "In My Room", by Johnny Farnham, B-side to "Sadie (The Cleaning Lady)"
 "In My Room", by The Last Shadow Puppets from The Age of the Understatement
 "In My Room", by Martin Page from In the House of Stone and Light
 "In My Room", by The Mutton Birds from Salty
 "In My Room", by Ready for the World from Long Time Coming
 "In My Room", by REZ from Civil Rites
 "In My Room", by Shinee from Replay
 "In My Room", by Thousand Foot Krutch from Oxygen: Inhale
 "In My Room", by Wild Orchid from Oxygen
 "In My Room", by Yazoo (Yaz) from Upstairs at Eric's
 "In My Room", by Yellow Claw from Blood for Mercy
 "In My Room", by Zebrahead from Playmate of the Year

Other uses
 In My Room (film), a 2018 German film
 "In My Room" (Grounded for Life), a television episode
 In My Room, a record label imprint founded by Trentemøller